Emigration from Mexico is the movement of people from Mexico to other countries. The top destination by far is the United States, by a factor of over 150 to 1 compared to the second most popular destination, Canada.

Overview
Emigration from Mexico began timidly about a century ago, but experienced a significant increase since the 1950s. The emigration phenomenon, in the case of Mexico, is diverse and varied through the country. This is due to the economic situation that applies mainly to impoverished people, who seek better job and growth opportunities in other countries. People in Mexico sought to establish themselves and their families in the United States where employment opportunities were more numerous, many having been displaced or made obsolete in their native country. Meanwhile the demand for labor in the United States was surging, and the country was in need of a low-skill workforce that wasn't able to be supplied fully by its own citizens, so Mexican workers were welcomed and served in this capacity (as many still do today). More than 11% of Mexico's native population lives abroad, making it the second highest country with emigrants behind India. 98% of all Mexican emigrants reside in the United States, which are more than 10.9 million (documented and undocumented) migrants. Estimates on the amount of Mexican emigrants of indigenous origin in the U.S. range between 50% and 90% of the entire emigrant population. There are no official numbers on the amount of indigenous Mexican migrants, as U.S. censuses do not cover their specific ethnic origin. Recent reports by the Pew Research Center (February 2012) indicate that the current migratory influx from Mexico to the U.S. is just below a net zero, as more Mexicans leave the U.S. Economic problems are, overall, the little stability of Mexican peso exchange rate compared to the United States dollar. Because of this, many Mexicans choose to leave their native country and look for better economic opportunities in the United States, and send dollars to their families in Mexico. For some, this is only a temporary stay in America while working. However, many others choose to permanently reside in the U.S. with their families. Although many families make the long, tiring trip from Mexico to the US border it is very dangerous especially for women as they are very vulnerable to physical and sexual abuse as the cargo trains people travel on, stop every so often in what people describe as the middle of nowhere. As well as being dangerous for women, it is a very extreme journey that goes through jungles and rivers, which is unsuitable for young children to embark on.

Destinations

Aside from the United States, Mexican immigrants have settled in Canada, Spain, Germany, Italy, the United Kingdom, France, Taiwan, Japan and other countries. A large Mexican immigrant population also exists in Central and South American countries as Guatemala, Costa Rica, Cuba, Brazil, Colombia, and Chile. Mexican Mennonites settled in Bolivia, Argentina and Paraguay. There have been cases of Mexicans working or residing in Saudi Arabia and other countries but not in demographically significative numbers.  Under "Aliyah", or the immigration of Jews of the Diaspora to Israel, an unspecified number of Mexican Jews have immigrated to Israel. In recent years Mexican business and engineering professionals have settled in African countries like Kenya, Nigeria and South Africa. 
 
Canada has a program that hires Mexican agricultural workers on a temporary basis. Many countries allow Mexicans opportunities in areas like science research, to study at colleges and universities, and through other cultural exchanges. The mass departure of artists, scientists, actors and more has led to a Mexican brain drain. However, recent years have shown an uptick in immigration to Mexico.

Estimates by country
The list below is of countries hosting Mexican descendent populations. 
 – 37,186,361
 – 85,825
 – 53,158
 – 18,003
 – 16,892
 – 7,420
 – 1,425
 – 863
 – 377
 – 95
 – 146
 – 19
 – 14
 – 24
 – 24
 – 179
 – 15
 – 37
 – 3
 – 60
 – 4
 – 3
 – 46
 –15
 – 168

Migrants

Mexicans account for the biggest group of immigrants living in America, but the number of immigrants coming into the U.S has started to decline. They primarily come from nine states: Zacatecas, Guanajuato, Michoacán, Oaxaca, Guerrero, San Luis Potosí, Hidalgo, Chiapas and Jalisco. In these states it is not uncommon to see towns where men have left in hope of finding work in the U.S. Often, while women stay in Mexico to take care of their children, husbands who find work in the U.S. send money to their families. This money, called remesas in Mexican Spanish, has become the second highest source of income that Mexico receives from other countries, second only to exports of petroleum and its products.  The jobs people took up in Mexico often set the tone for the work Mexican immigrant will take up when they arrived in the United States. A survey has shown that families are not the only ones affected physically and emotionally by their migration, but it also affects the family members that were left behind.

Recent economic opportunities and advantages with international treaties, harassment, and threatening insecurity have induced even some affluent persons to leave the country.

History
Following the Mexican–American War which was concluded by the Treaty of Guadalupe Hidalgo in 1848, and later, the Gadsden Purchase in 1853, approximately 300,000 Mexican nationals found themselves living within the United States.  Throughout the rest of the 19th century and early 20th century, Mexican migration was not subject to any restrictions, and Mexicans were free to move across the border, and often did so, typically in order for them to work in professions such as the construction of the railway system, or as seasonal agricultural laborers.  From 1910 to 1920, the political violence and societal chaos caused by the Mexican Revolution also played a role in increasing migration northwards.  Economic inequality, rural poverty, significantly lower wages, and better opportunities have also played a role throughout the 20th century as factors pulling Mexicans to migrate to the US.

The immigration laws of the U.S. such as Emergency Quota Act generally allowed exemptions for Mexico, while being more restrictive to citizens of the Eastern Hemisphere.  Mexicans received special allowances under U.S. immigration law due to the importance of Mexican labor in the U.S. economy.  One example of these allowances is the Immigration Act of 1917.  Under this act, all potential immigrants would have to pass a literacy test and pay a head tax. At the request of growers in the southwest who depended on farm labor from Mexico, the U.S. Secretary of Labor waived those requirements for Mexican immigrants. The groups interested in the availability of inexpensive labor ensured that the immigration laws in place throughout the early 20th century did not adversely affect the movement of Mexican migrants, in spite of calls on the part of some of the southern states' congressmen to put an end to the open border policies. The population of Mexican immigration took a turn. In the years between 2010 and 2017, the immigration numbers increased, with a reduction by 2014. In recent years, immigration has slowed down, as has the Mexican economy. More people have been counted returning to Mexico than immigrating to the U.S., with Mexico no longer being the main source of immigrants. From 2012–16, most Mexican immigration was to California and Texas. In that period of time, Los Angeles, Chicago, and Houston were the largest cities with notable populations of Mexican immigrants.

Effects of governmental policies on Mexican immigration in the U.S.
Major effects of governmental policies on Mexican immigration in the U.S. are as follows:

Restrictive regulations

The Great Depression in 1929 brought an abrupt end to these allowances that had been made for the benefit of Mexican workers. With the beginning of the Great Depression, the worldwide economic slowdown and the desperate search for jobs within the U.S., anti-immigration sentiment rose. Thousands of Mexicans were forced back across the border and barriers to future immigrants were constructed.  From 1929 to 1931, legal Mexican immigration entries fell by 95%, and in the next ten years as many as 400,000 Mexican citizens were repatriated.

More admissive regulations
The limitations on Mexican immigration lasted until the beginning of World War II, when the U.S. found itself short of labor.  In 1942 the U.S. and Mexico instituted the Bracero program. Under this arrangement, millions of Mexican laborers were contracted to agricultural work in the U.S. While under contract they were given housing and received a minimum wage of thirty cents an hour. The program was intended to provide the U.S. with temporary workers while many working-age residents were away at war. In order to ensure that braceros did not stay in the U.S., their wives and families were not allowed to accompany them. Additionally, 10% of each worker's wage was withheld to be given back upon the worker's return to Mexico, though few U.S. employers complied.

The Bracero Program displays that 4.6 million Mexican nationals took farm labor jobs, showing that this program had influenced many to come to the United States for work. These workers paved the way for many of the migrant labor programs in the U.S. today.

The Bracero Program allowed agribusiness access to a large pool of labor that had virtually no civil rights, and no recourse to address growing injustices.  This inequity was seen in poor working conditions and the decrease in agricultural wages, which during the 1950s, actually dropped below the levels they were at during World War II.  The U.S. did not report the conditions that immigrants faced, in fear that the Bracero Program would be jeopardized. Nor did Mexico and the U.S. agree on a contract which ensured the safety of the Mexican people. As the war ended, few returning soldiers returned to the jobs that the braceros were holding, and instead, they moved on to more industrial areas and reinforced the belief that immigrants take on the jobs that Americans would not be willing to do.

Historical border issues
In response to the growing number of Mexicans entering illegally, the United States government implemented Operation Wetback in 1954. The racial term "Wetback" originated when Mexicans crossed the river Rio Grande in order to illegally reside in Texas. Under the direction of the Immigration and Naturalization Service (INS), the Border Patrol began deporting Mexicans who were in the United States illegally, and up to one million Mexicans were deported. Operation Wetback ended not long after its launch, due to the complaints regarding the violence involved in the deportations, and the fact that in many cases children who were United States citizens were deported with their immigrant parents.

Continuing migration
Although the Bracero Program ended in 1964, the migration of Mexican workers did not.  The Immigration and Nationality Act of 1952 which had put limits on the total number of visas granted, was amended in 1965 following the termination of the Bracero Program.  These amendments put an end to the quota system, and instead, created a total number of visas allowed to the Western Hemisphere.  Exceptions to that total number were granted to spouses, minors and parents of United States citizens. However, the total allotment of 120,000 in 1965 still was not enough to address the demand for visas from Mexico.  By 1976, there was a two-year waiting period for any eligible applicant from the Western Hemisphere before they could receive a visa.

Displaced workers in northern Mexico
A contributing factor to the persistently high numbers of migrants from Mexico was the creation of the Border Industrialization Program in 1965.  The termination of the Bracero Program in 1964 had led to both a shortage of workers willing to work for lower wages in the United States, and a high population of displaced workers at the northern Mexico border.  The result of this imbalance in the supply and demand of labor in the two countries in turn led the creation of this new agreement that allowed the construction of foreign-owned factories in northern Mexico.  These factories are referred to as maquiladoras or maquilas, and provided both Mexico and the United States with a number of benefits.  The factories provided Mexico with a way to increase its manufactured exports to the United States, and in return, the United States received tax benefits for placing its factories within Mexico. For example, the equipment imported into Mexico to be used in the factories was not subject to import taxes, and the final product was only taxed on the value that was added at the factory, rather than the entirety of the item.

The creation of the maquilas program provided jobs to the displaced Bracero Program workers and allowed the United States to continue to use labor from Mexico, which was less expensive than labor in the United States.  The popularity of this program is evident in the incredible increase in the number of maquilas in operation: in 1967 there were 57 maquiladoras operating in Mexico; less than ten years later in 1976, that number had increased to 552. The rise in the number of available jobs in the region led to an extreme swell in the population of the border towns.  The maquiladora industry employed 4000 people in 1967, and by 1981 that amount grew to more than 130,000.  The maquilas drew the population north to the border in search of employment opportunities, but in many cases the northward pull did not stop there.  The proximity of the United States with its markedly higher standard of living continued to pull the people who had migrated to border region even farther north, and led to higher numbers of migrants crossing the United States – Mexico border.

Amendments to the Immigration and Nationality Act continued throughout the 1970s.  In 1976 the United States Congress imposed a limit of 20,000 visas per country per year in the Western Hemisphere.  At that time Mexico was exceeding that amount by approximately 40,000.  In 1978 a new amendment was put in place that enacted a worldwide immigration policy, allowing 290,000 visas per year total, with no limitations per country.

The end of the Bracero Program combined with restrictions put on the number of visas allowed by the United States greatly increased the levels of illegal migration from Mexico. As a response, in 1986 the United States enacted the Immigration Reform and Control Act (IRCA).  Under this act, all undocumented migrants living in the United States as of January 1, 1982, as well as those who had labored in the seasonal agriculture work for at least ninety days during the previous years were granted legal residence.  IRCA also made it possible to impose civil and criminal penalties on any employer who knowingly hired undocumented workers.  Although a legalization of current undocumented workers, coupled with the increase in penalties suffered by employers who employed future undocumented workers was meant to decrease the total number of undocumented migrants in the United States, the actions did not produce the desired effect; as is evidenced by the number of apprehensions achieved through border patrolling.

Reversal of net migration between Mexico and the U.S.

Pew Research Center statistics found approximately equal amounts of migration in both direction for the period 2005-2010, with net migration toward Mexico of about 130,000 people from 2009 to 2014. Pew found this trend reversed again for the period 2013-2018, with net migration of about 160,000 people toward the United States.

Reasons for trend reversal
Several major factors contribute to a general sense among Mexican migrants and potential migrants that there is less profit and more danger to migrate to the U.S., leading many of them to decide that it is better to leave the U.S. or to stay in Mexico:
 The decline of fertility in Mexico has resulted in proportionally fewer young people, and thus lower migration to the U.S.
 The 2008–2012 economic crisis of 2008 has led to a decline of work opportunities in the U.S., meaning that many migrants who came to the U.S. for work couldn't find any. Access to social security, healthcare and education in the U.S. has also become more difficult.
 The economic situation in Mexico has become better, ensuring better access to healthcare, education, and jobs. This reduces the incentive for Mexicans to leave the country.
 Since 2010, U.S. legislation has placed stricter controls on illegal immigration: several American states have criminalized illegal immigration. Deportations under the Obama administration (2009-2017) reached record numbers.
 During the last few years, violence associated with drug cartels and organized crime has been on the rise in Northern Mexico, making the routes for passing the border more dangerous.
Mexicans and Americans Thinking Together (MATT) conducted 600 in-depth, in-person interviews of migrants who returned to the Mexican state of Jalisco, and found that family reasons and nostalgia are the primary cited reasons for return migration to Mexico. The research also found that of the interviewed migrants who moved back to Mexico, only about 11% were forced to leave the United States due to being deported. 75% of the respondents cited that their reasons for return migration were self-motivated.

Developments in Mexico
Mexican source communities, mostly indigenous villages, are most often poor. To survive economically, such areas rely heavily on the emigration of some of their members and on the remittances they send back. Emigration can function as an escape valve to alleviate economic pressures, as it provides a source of income and opens up work opportunities in villages of origin. The return of many migrants thus causes great stress on these communities, who are heading for economic crisis as important sources of income fall away and more people become unemployed as there is less work available. The states most affected by this phenomenon try to take action to help those who come back, but the full economic impact of the return of migrants is still to come.

While emigrants return to their (mostly poor) home communities, sending them into economic crisis, another migration phenomenon is accelerating: internal migration. The lack of work opportunities in small villages drives people to migrate to large cities, rather than to the U.S.  With 78% of the Mexican population living in urban zones, slums are growing fast. Urban violence and crime, stunted growth, malnutrition, poor elementary education, poor hygiene and inadequate sanitation are just some of the implications of life in urban slums. According to UNICEF, urban migration has badly worsened the reach of social schemes of health and nutrition.

Among communities of origin, there is a widespread ambivalence towards migrants, as the money they send back is welcome, but there is resentment against the cultural changes that they bring with them when they come back. Returning migrants are blamed for bringing with them drug use, sexually-transmitted diseases, and antisocial behavior. They are held responsible for the abandonment of the traditional indigenous way of life as they bring back western cultural habits and material culture. The return of migrants to Mexico thus has important cultural repercussions and changes the face of their home communities forever.

Developments in the U.S.
In the U.S., Hispanics account for 54% of the day-labor workforce and there is a large market for cheap day-laborers. This sector constitutes a non-negligible part of the U.S. economy. With the current migration trends, within a few years, Mexico will not be able to cover current demand for Mexican labor of its neighbor anymore. Migration from El Salvador, Guatemala, and Honduras to the U.S. is rising, as their migrants begin to replace Mexican workers. It is however unclear whether other Hispanic American countries follow these trends, and it is unsure whether the gap left by returning Mexicans will be filled by such migrants. Jeffrey Passel, chief demographer of the Pew Center, says the consequences for the U.S. economy may be important.

Since 2010, deportations of illegal immigrants have increased, as deportation procedures became more systematic and border controls were reinforced with police and military patrols. Several states, such as Arizona and Alabama, have passed laws that criminalize illegal migration. Proposed acts that offer easier paths to U.S. citizenship for immigrants, such as the DREAM Act, have been rejected.

Distribution by country

See also

Mexican Repatriation, from US in 1930s
Immigration to Mexico
Foreign relations of Mexico
Demographics of Mexico
Immigrant parents raising U.S. Citizens in an unknown country. With this migration, come many challenges, especially while raising children.

References

Further reading

 Adelman, Jeremy and Stephen Aron. “From Borderlands to Borders: Empires, Nation-States, and the peoples in between North American History.”  American Historical Review 104#3 (June 1999): 814-841. 
 Alba, Francisco. “Mexico: The New Migration Narrative,” (Migration Policy Institute, April 24, 2013) online

 Asad, Asad L., and Filiz Garip. "Mexico-US migration in time: from economic to social mechanisms." ANNALS of the American Academy of Political and Social Science 684.1 (2019): 60-84. online

 Bilecen, Başak, and Miranda J. Lubbers. "The networked character of migration and transnationalism." Global Networks 21.4 (2021): 837-852. online
 Cantú, Lionel, Nancy A. Naples, and Salvador Vidal Ortiz. The Sexuality of Migration: Border Crossings and Mexican Immigrant Men (New York University Press, 2009).

 Dear, Michael. Border Witness: Reimagining the US-Mexico Borderlands Through Film (Univ of California Press, 2023).
 Durand, Jorge, and Douglas S. Massey, eds.  Crossing the Border: Research from the Mexican Migration Project (Russell Sage Foundation, 2004).
 Durand, Jorge, and Douglas S. Massey. "Debacles on the border: Five decades of fact-free immigration policy." Annals of the American Academy of Political and Social Science 684.1 (2019): 6-20. online
 Durand, Jorge, and Douglas S. Massey. "Mexican migration to the United States: a critical review." Latin American Research Review 27 (1992): 3 – 42.
 Durand, Jorge, Douglas S. Massey, and Emilio A. Parrado. "The New Era of Mexican Migration to the United States." Journal of American History 86#2  (1999): 518-36. online

 Fishman, Ram, and Shan Li. "Agriculture, irrigation and drought induced international migration: Evidence from Mexico." Global Environmental Change 75 (2022): 102548. online
 Gratton, Brian, and Emily Merchant. “Immigration, Repatriation, and Deportation: The Mexican-Origin Population in the United States, 1920–1950.” International Migration Review 47#4 pp. 944–75. online
 Hernández Campos, Carlos, and Eduardo Torre Cantalapiedra. "How can Mexican migrants reduce the risk of being abandoned by smugglers while clandestinely crossing the US–Mexico border?." Migration Studies 10.4 (2022): 746-765.
 Light, Michael T., and Dimeji Togunde. “The Mexican Immigration Debate: Assimilation and Public Policy.” International Review of Modern Sociology vol. 44, no. 1/2, 2018, pp. 127–41. online.
 Massey, Douglas S., Jorge Durand, and Nolan J. Malone. Beyond Smoke and Mirrors: Mexican Immigration in an Age of Economic Integration (Russell Sage Foundation, 2002).
 Parrado, Emilio A., and Angie N. Ocampo. "Continuities and changes in the processes of Mexican migration and return." ANNALS of the American Academy of Political and Social Science 684.1 (2019): 212-226. online

 Rendon-Ramos, Erika. "Between Borders: A Comparative Study of Traditional and Fronterizo Migration from Mexico to the United States, 1965-2007" (PhD dissertation in History, Rice University, 2019) online.

 Rodilitz, Scott, and Edward H. Kaplan. "Snapshot Models of Undocumented Immigration." Risk Analysis 41.9 (2021): 1643-1661. online
 Sarabia, Heidy, Laura Zaragoza, and Alejandra Aguilar. "Navigating the regime of illegality: Experiences of migration and racialization among 1.5-generation Mexican migrant women." in  Displacement, Belonging, and Migrant Agency in the Face of Power (Routledge, 2022) pp. 298-314.

Demographics of Mexico
Mexico